Akon Etim Eyakenyi  (born 24 February 1960 in Urue-Offong/Oruko, Nigeria) is a Nigerian politician. She is the current senator representing Akwa Ibom south senatorial district in Akwa Ibom State. She was elected into the senate during the 2019 general elections of Nigeria. She won with a total vote of 122,412. Before being elected into the senate she was the former Minister of Lands, Housing and Urban Development during the regime of President Goodluck Ebele Jonathan.

Early life and education 
Eyakenyi was born in 1960 into the family of Chief Uweh Isangedihi in Urue-Offong/Oruko local government area in Akwa Ibom State. In 1968 she attended Government Primary School, Uko Uyokim where she finished with her First School Leaving Certificate in 1974. In 1974 she enrolled into the Methodist Teacher’s Training College in Oron and graduated with Teachers Grade II Certificate in 1979.

In 1983 Akon enrolled into the University of Calabar and was given Nigerian Certificate in Education (NCE) in 1986. In 1990, she obtained a Bachelor of Education (B.Ed) degree from the University of Calabar. She also obtained a Master of Education (M.Ed) and Doctor of Philosophy (Ph.D) in Curriculum Education in 2010 and 2014 respectively.
She is married with children and grand children.

Career 
Akon Eyakenyi began her career as a teacher when she was appointed Mistress I & II by the Cross River State Education board where she served from 1986 to 1993. In 1991, while serving as a teacher she was appointed Supervisor for Education, Youths, Sports and Culture in Oron. Subsequently she served in the Akwa Ibom State ministry of education 1993 to 1999 as an Education officer. In 1999, she was appointed to serve in the Akwa Ibom State Education board.

In 2000, she was appointed Commissioner for Industry, Commerce and Tourism in Akwa Ibom State during the regime of Victor Attah. In 2013, she was appointed by Godswill Akpabio as Chairman of Akwa Ibom State Technical Schools Board. She served as Chairman of the board until her appointment by President Goodluck Jonathan as Minister of Lands, Housing and Urban Development in 2014.

Senate 
In 2018, Eyakenyi declared her intentions to run for senate and represent Akwa Ibom South senatorial district. In October 2018, she participated in the party primaries of the People's Democratic Party (Nigeria) to represent Akwa Ibom South senatorial district and emerged the winner in the primaries. On 25 February 2019 she was declared winner of the 2019 general elections to represent Akwa Ibom South senatorial district.

References 

Oron people
Living people
1960 births
Members of the Senate (Nigeria)
Peoples Democratic Party (Nigeria) politicians
University of Calabar alumni